Hannah Bailey Tapp (born June 21, 1995) is an American volleyball player who plays as a middle blocker. Since 2019, she plays professionally in Japan. She is a member of the United States women's national volleyball team since 2017.

Personal life

Tapp grew up in Stewartville, Minnesota. She graduated from Stewartville High School in 2013. In addition to volleyball, she also played basketball and was a track & field athlete in high school. She has an identical twin sister, Paige, who also played volleyball for Minnesota and the U.S. national team.

Career

College
Tapp played collegiately for Minnesota. She had 978 kills and 551 career blocks, with an overall total of 1,273 points throughout her career. She was named an AVCA 1st Team All-American in 2015 and a 2nd Team All-American in 2016. 

Tapp graduated Minnesota with a degree in management in 2017. She was a finalist for the Senior CLASS Award in volleyball.

Professional clubs

Tapp has played professionally in Germany, Italy, and currently plays in Japan's V. League 1 team Hitachi Rivale.

USA national team

Tapp made her debut with U.S. Women's National Team at the 2017 FIVB World Grand Prix. She was named "Best Middle Blocker" at the 2019 Pan American Cup after helping lead team USA to its third consecutive gold medal, recording five blocks and four kills in the championship match victory versus the Dominican Republic.

Awards and honors

College

AVCA Second Team All-American (2016)
AVCA First Team All-American (2015)
Big Ten All-Freshman team (2013)

International

2019 Pan-American Cup – Best Middle Blocker

References

1995 births
Living people
People from Stewartville, Minnesota
Sportspeople from Minnesota
Middle blockers
American women's volleyball players
Minnesota Golden Gophers women's volleyball players
University of Minnesota alumni
American expatriate sportspeople in Germany
Expatriate volleyball players in Germany
American expatriate sportspeople in Italy
Expatriate volleyball players in Italy
American expatriate sportspeople in Japan
Expatriate volleyball players in Japan
Serie A1 (women's volleyball) players
American twins